Tachrichim (Hebrew: תכריכים) are traditional simple white burial furnishings, usually made from 100% pure linen, in which the bodies of deceased Jews are dressed by the Chevra Kadisha, or other burial group, for interment after undergoing a taharah (ritual purification).

In Hebrew, tachrichim means to "enwrap" or "bind". It comes from the Biblical verse "And Mordechai left the king's presence in royal apparel of blue and white and a huge golden crown and a wrap of linen (tachrich butz) and purple, and the city of Shushan rejoiced and was happy".

History
The traditional clothing for burying the dead are tachrichim, simple white garments or furnishings, including a winding sheet (sovev). According to the Talmud, Rabban Gamliel observed that the custom of dressing the deceased in expensive clothing put such a terrible burden on the relatives of the deceased, that they would "abandon the body and run."

The custom he initiated – which set both a decorous minimum and a limit on ostentation – has been followed by observant Jews ever since. "Whoever heaps elaborate shrouds upon the dead transgresses the injunction against wanton destruction. Such a one disgraces the deceased." The universal use of shrouds protected the poor from embarrassment at not being able to afford lavish burial clothes. Since shrouds have no pockets, wealth or status cannot be expressed or acknowledged in death. In every generation, these garments reaffirmed a fundamental belief in human equality.

Tachrichim are white and entirely hand stitched, without tying knots. They are made without buttons, zippers, or fasteners. Tahrihim come in muslin or linen, fabrics that recall the garments of the ancient Hebrew priesthood. There is little difference in appearance or cost between them; the funeral home may or may not offer a choice. Tahrihim come packaged in sets for men and women. Regardless of gender, they include a tunic, pants, hood, and belt. The belt is tied to form the shape of the Hebrew letter shin, which stands for Shaddai, one of the accepted representations of God's ineffable Name. If the pants are not closed at the bottom to cover the feet, "booties" are additionally provided.  The face is generally covered with a sudarium, much as in traditional artistic representations of Lazarus or Jesus in His tomb. Men may also be wrapped in a kittel, a simple, white ceremonial robe that some Jews wear on Yom Kippur, at the Passover seder, and under the wedding canopy. In earlier times, the sisterhoods or women's auxiliaries would make shrouds for their community; this practice may still occur in traditional communities.

If the body has been prepared for burial with ritual cleansing (taharah), the body will automatically be dressed in tahrihim. Jewish funeral homes and burial societies (chevra kadishim) in general have a supply on hand, and the cost may be covered by their honorarium.

In addition to tachrichim, some Jewish men are wrapped in the prayer shawl (tallit) in which they prayed. In this case, before the tallit is placed on a body for burial, one of its sets of fringes (tzitzit'') is cut to demonstrate that the person is no longer bound by the religious obligations of the living.

Tahrihim swaddle the entire body, including the face, so that the deceased is both clothed and protected against the gaze of other people. If shrouds are used, the body is placed in the coffin, which is then closed. In Israel, it is customary to bury the deceased (except soldiers) without a coffin.

Today, virtually all (Jewish) mortuaries carry tachrichim. The prices vary, depending on whether it is cotton or linen, or whether it is hand sewn.

See also
 Shroud

References

Bereavement in Judaism
Hebrew words and phrases